The following is a list of international K–12 schools located in provincial cities of the Philippines, sorted by region, that both have international curricula and international pre-tertiary-education accreditation. There are numerous schools in the Philippines that have the word "International" in their names as a marketing ploy and not true international schools.

True international schools are few since they had to be established by legislation or presidential decrees.

Metro Manila region

Luzon provincial cities

By accreditation

Cambridge Assessment International Education
Casa Kalayaan International School (Subic Bay Freeport Zone)
Westfields International School (Angeles)

Advanced Placement Program
Noblesse International School (Angeles)
Saint Paul American School - Clark (Clark Freeport Zone)

International Baccalaureate
The Beacon Academy (Biñan)
Brent International School Manila (Biñan)
Learning Links Academy (Santa Rosa, Laguna ; Silang, Cavite)
Noblesse International School (Angeles)

International Schools Association
Brentwood College of Asia International School (Naga, Camarines Sur)
Gentry International School (Clark Freeport Zone)
Kids International Learning Academy (Cainta)
Westfields International School (Angeles)

Western Association of Schools and Colleges
Brentwood College of Asia International School (Naga, Camarines Sur)
Brent International School Manila (Biñan)
Stonyhurst Southville International School - Malarayat (Lipa City Campus)
Stonyhurst Southville International School - Batangas City – Republic Act No. 9493

Visayas provincial cities

By accreditation

Cambridge Assessment International Education
Centre for International Education - CIE British School (Cebu & Tacloban)
Singapore School Cebu (Mandaue)
Woodridge International School (Mandaue)

Council of British International Schools
ONE International School Philippines (Dauin)

International Baccalaureate
Cebu International School – Republic Act 9190
Singapore School Cebu (Mandaue)

Mindanao provincial cities
Joji Ilagan International Schools (Davao City & General Santos City)
Philippine Nikkei Jin Kai International School (Davao City)
Precious International School of Davao (Davao City)

References

External links

Top Schools in the Philippines (Directory)

Philippines
 
International